The 1996 Australian Grand Prix was a Formula One motor race held at Melbourne on 10 March 1996. It was the first race of the 1996 Formula One World Championship, and the first Australian Grand Prix to be held at Melbourne, taking over from Adelaide.

The 58-lap race was won by Damon Hill, driving a Williams-Renault. Hill's teammate Jacques Villeneuve, making his Formula One debut, took pole position and led for most of the race, before an oil leak enabled Hill to catch and pass him in the closing laps. Eddie Irvine finished third in a Ferrari.

Report

Background

This was the second Grand Prix in a row held in Australia, the previous race being the conclusion to the 1995 season.

Taki Inoue was scheduled to race for the Minardi team as a pay driver but when no money materialised prior to the race he was replaced by Giancarlo Fisichella. Marlboro had expressed interest in Fisichella running early on.

The race was the first to use the new race-start system, still used in Formula 1 today, replacing the old red to green light system. Under the new system, five red lights would come on at one second intervals, starting after the last driver reached his grid box. There would then be a pre-determined pause, and then the five lights would go off simultaneously. This was also the first race to have a single qualifying session on Saturday afternoon; the Friday session was dropped.

Qualifying 

Jacques Villeneuve, making his début in Formula One, took pole position.

Both Forti cars failed make the race due to the new 107% rule for qualifying, which stated that any car that qualified 107% slower than the pole time (1:38.837 in this race) would be excluded. The measure was introduced as excessively slow entrants presented potential safety hazards due to a high speed difference.  Incidentally, the team had logged its best result of 7th one race earlier at the season-ending 1995 Australian Grand Prix.

Race 

It was an all-Williams front row with Damon Hill and debutant Jacques Villeneuve in the blue and white Rothmans cars.
In the first corner Hill was squeezed by Irvine, lost momentum and was overtaken by both Ferraris in the run down going into the third corner. Behind Hill, Alesi sliced across in front of Hakkinen and Barrichello to claim the corner and began a chain reaction of heavy braking as drivers tried to avoid colliding with one another. David Coulthard veered left under braking and his McLaren hit the side of Herbert's Sauber. Herbert tried to avoid the car and braked heavily. Martin Brundle was behind them and unable to slow sufficiently, hitting the rear of Herbert's and Coulthard's cars and was launched into a barrel roll, ending in a sand trap at turn 3 and breaking his car in two. Brundle was unhurt. The race was halted to allow the circuit to be cleared.

The race was restarted. Brundle (in the spare car) spun off after light contact with Pedro Diniz. The Williams dominated again, with Jacques Villeneuve leading Hill. Schumacher held on in third place, but dropped back half a minute with his second pit stop. He developed brake problems on lap 28 and retired five laps later. Irvine assumed third, despite contact with Jean Alesi's Benetton on lap 6, when Alesi had attempted to pass him. Towards the end of the race Villeneuve was slowed by an oil leak, which allowed Hill to catch and pass him. Hill took his 14th Grand Prix victory, equaling his father Graham's overall number of wins. In the end, the podium was Hill-Villeneuve-Irvine.

Classification

Qualifying

Race

Notes
 – Herbert is listed as 'Did Not Start' in the official results, despite having taken the first start prior to the race being stopped. Regulations at the time were such that in the event of a stoppage being ordered on the first lap, that start would be deemed null and void, and the second start would take place as if the first had never occurred. As he did not make the second start, he’s classified as DNS.

Championship standings after the race

Drivers' Championship standings

Constructors' Championship standings

References

Grand Prix
Australian Grand Prix
Australian Grand Prix
Australian Grand Prix